Juliet Cesario (born July 14, 1967) is an American actress best known for her voice work in anime, Miyuki Kobayakawa in You're Under Arrest, Belldandy in Oh! My Goddess the OVA series, Peorth in the 2nd season TV series Ah! My Goddess: Flights of Fancy, and Nokoru Imonoyama in Clamp School Detectives. Cesario has also appeared in many television series, films, and stage productions.

Biography
Cesario has attended several anime conventions, including Otakon in 1997 and 1998, and Ohayocon and JACON in 2003, and Animazement in 2007. She has also made appearances in many television shows and films. She has previously worked with Coastal Studios for voice overs.

Cesario is now currently active as an actress in television, film, and animation. She starred in a television movie called What you Want that aired on YTV in September 2008. She can be seen in Surface, One Tree Hill, among many other TV shows and movies including Star Trek: The Next Generation.

Filmography

Television
 American Gothic - Gail's Mother ("Dammed if You Don't")
 Dawson's Creek - Assistant ("The Kiss")
 One Tree Hill - Birth Mom, Bustier Woman, Waitress
 Star Trek: The Next Generation - Lt. Baji
 Surface - ICU Nurse ("Ep. 1.10")
 Will & Grace - Jeanette ("Bi-Plane"), Cashier ("Jack's Big Gay Wedding")
 Zombies VS. Ninjas: The Web Series - Juliet ("Doppelgangrene")

Film
 Bruno - Nurse #2
 House Arrest - Zooey D (Short film, voice)
 The Kicker - Protester VO
 #lifegoals - Woman
 Little Red Wagon - Dana Philp
 Maggie Tales - Maggie (Short film, voice)
 Our Almost Completely True Story - Myna Bird Lady
 Starbucks Lovers - Susan (Short film)
 Yucatán - Additional Voices (English dub)

Dubbing roles

Anime
 A.D. Police Files - Iris Cara
 Ah! My Goddess: Flights of Fancy - Peorth
 Blue Submarine No.6 - Mutio, Villagers (ep. 4)
 Clamp School Detectives - Nokoru Imonoyama
 Crusher Joe - Alfin
 Earthian - Takako
 Elf Princess Rane - Rane
 Kageki Shojo!! - Mirei Nohara
 Oh My Goddess! - Belldandy
 Princess Rouge: Legend of the Last Labyrinth - Rouge
 Shinesman - Hitomi Kasahara
 The Special Duty Combat Unit Shinesman - Lafure
 Virtua Fighter - Sarah Bryant
 Voogie's Angel - Shiori Tachibana
 You're Under Arrest - Miyuki Kobayakawa
 You're Under Arrest Specials - Miyuki Kobayakawa

Anime Film
 Crusher Joe: The Movie - Alfin
 You're Under Arrest: The Motion Picture - Miyuki Kobayakawa

References

External links
 
 
 Juliet Cesario at the CrystalAcids Anime Voice Actor Database
 Juliet Cesario Interview at DVD Vision Japan
 

20th-century American actresses
21st-century American actresses
American film actresses
American television actresses
American voice actresses
Living people
Actresses from Los Angeles
Actresses from North Carolina
People from Wilmington, North Carolina
University of Findlay alumni
1967 births